Elven Legacy is a turn-based strategy video game developed by 1C:Ino-Co and published by Paradox Interactive. Released in Russia in 2007 and elsewhere in 2009 for Microsoft Windows, the game is a sequel to Fantasy Wars. On October 11, 2011, Virtual Programming released Elven Legacy Collection, which includes the original game and its three expansion packs, for Mac OS X.

Gameplay
The gameplay, like its predecessor, Fantasy Wars, is a turn-based strategy game. The player moves its units, each representing a single hero or a small soldier company, through hexagonal maps dictating where they go and when they attack. Once all units have exhausted both their move points and their (single) action for the turn the pc-controlled enemies (or the other human players, if online) start their movements and actions. As with Fantasy Wars, units are inspired by the typical fantasy races in a fantasy-medieval setting. Usually, a mission requires a certain list of objectives to fulfill (kill certain enemies, or reach a certain town on the map) with "prizes" awarded at the end of the mission based on how many turns the player needed to achieve them.

Plot
The game presents a time when five races existed: elves, orcs, humans, the undead, and dwarves. The races are in conflict for possession of one land where the orcs once have been driven away by the human race. A hundred years later, the orcs prepare for a war to recapture their motherland. At the same time, the other races declare war against the human race in an effort to capture the territory in which humans lived. The player can either choose to play as the elves or the orcs.

Reception

The game received above-average reviews according to the review aggregation website Metacritic.

Expansions
At E3 2009, Paradox Interactive announced the expansion pack Elven Legacy: Ranger. The Ranger expansion adds 16 new missions, three new heroes, five unique artifacts, and 12 new spells.

Elven Legacy: Siege was released on November 17, 2009. The expansion includes large-scale battles of large armies, and the capture of many-hexed cities. The expansion has the following new features: a campaign consisting of 19 missions with a nonlinear storyline; control of two armies; three new heroes; and bonus missions.

Elven Legacy: Magic was released on December 3, 2009. This expansion is the most recent in the series of games about the world of Illis. The expansion has the following new features: new heroes, unusual tactical possibilities, new spells and artifacts, and bonus missions.

On June 21, Virtual Programming announced the original Elven Legacy title was to be brought to the Mac OS X platform in late 2009. The publisher shipped the game, along with the three expansion packs, for Mac OS X on October 11, 2011.

References

External links
Official website

2007 video games
1C Company games
Fantasy video games
Games for Windows certified games
MacOS games
Multiplayer and single-player video games
Orcs in popular culture
Paradox Interactive games
Strategy video games
Video games developed in Russia
Video games featuring female protagonists
Video games with expansion packs
Windows games